Dulaur is a small village in Jagdishpur block of Bhojpur district in Bihar, India. As of 2011, its population was 345, in 47 households. Located 2 km east of Jagdishpur, Dulaur is known as having been the site of the final battle between Kunwar Singh and the British army during the Indian Rebellion of 1857.

References 

Villages in Bhojpur district, India